Feodor Fedorenko or Fyodor Federenko (September 17, 1907 – July 28, 1987) was a Soviet-Nazi collaborator and war criminal who served at Treblinka extermination camp in German occupied Poland during World War II. As a former Soviet citizen admitted to the United States under a DPA visa (1949), Fedorenko became a naturalized U.S. citizen in 1970. He was discovered in 1977 and denaturalized in 1981. Subsequently, he was deported to the USSR, sentenced to death there for treason and participating in the Holocaust. Fedorenko was executed in 1987.

Early life
Fedorenko was born in Dzhankoy in the Sivash region of the Crimea, in southern Ukraine (then part of the Russian Empire).

World War II
He was mobilized into the Soviet Army in June 1941, around the time of the Nazi German Operation Barbarossa. He was a truck driver, and had no previous military training. Within two or three weeks, his group was encircled twice by the German army. He escaped the first time, but he was captured three days later by the Germans and transported to Zhytomyr, then Rivne, and finally to Chełm, Poland.

At the Chełm prisoner-of-war camp, German officers from Operation Reinhard recruited 200 to 300 captured Soviet Soldiers for military training as auxiliary police in the service of Nazi Germany within General Government. They were sent to the Trawniki concentration camp SS training division, and Fedorenko was among them. 

Fedorenko was one of approximately 5,000 Trawniki men trained as Holocaust executioners by SS-Hauptsturmführer Karl Streibel from Operation Reinhard. The Hiwi shooters, known in German as the Trawnikimänner, were deployed to all major killing sites of the Final Solution, augmented by the SS and Schupo, as well as Ordnungspolizei formations. The German Order Police performed roundups inside the Jewish ghettos in German-occupied Poland shooting everyone unable to move or attempting to flee, while the Trawnikis conducted large-scale civilian massacres in the same locations. It was their primary purpose of training. In the spring of 1942 Fedorenko was deployed from Trawniki to the Lublin Ghetto. It is known from historical record that between mid-March and mid-April 1942 over 30,000 Jews from Lublin Ghetto were transported to their deaths in cattle trucks at the Bełżec extermination camp and additional 4,000 at Majdanek. Fedorenko claimed in his postwar hearing that he was issued a rifle which was not fired. From Lublin, he was sent to the Warsaw Ghetto with his Sonderdienst battalion of 80 to 100 executioners. He was dispatched to Treblinka approximately in September 1942.

Fedorenko became a non-commissioned officer attaining the rank of Oberwacher. From September 1942 to August 1943, he led a 200-member ex-Soviet Soldier detachment which shaved, stripped, beat and gassed prisoners brought to Treblinka.

The report of the Soviet Interrogation of Defendant Aleksandr Ivanovich Yeger (born in 1918, Germany), includes the section devoted to Fedorenko's activities at the Treblinka extermination camp in occupied Poland (excerpt).

Escape to and life in the United States

After the end of the war, Fedorenko abandoned his wife and two children, who remained in the Soviet Union, and spent four years living as a war refugee in West Germany, working for the British from 1945 to 1949. Fedorenko emigrated to the United States from Hamburg in 1949 and was granted permanent residency status under the Displaced Persons Act. He initially resided in Philadelphia but later settled in Waterbury, Connecticut, where he found employment as a brass factory worker. Fedorenko would reside in Waterbury for the next two decades.

While Fedorenko's life in the United States was quiet, he had been identified as a possible war criminal. Treblinka survivors identified him as a guard at the camp from a collection of photographs and documents that had been captured from the SS. In the mid-sixties his name and Waterbury, Connecticut address were included on a list of fifty-nine war criminals living in America. The list was compiled in Europe and Israel and forwarded to the Immigration and Naturalization Service (INS) in the United States.

He was granted U.S. citizenship in 1970, however and later retired to Miami Beach, Florida in 1973. In the mid-70s, Congressional Representatives Joshua Eilberg and Elizabeth Holtzman initiated a set of hearings that led the US Government Accountability Office (GAO) to investigate the handling of possible Nazi war criminal data. No mishandling was found, but as a result, a Special Litigation Unit for the investigation of Nazi war criminals was established in the INS. The information supplied in the sixties was now put to use. In 1977, the INS supplied information on Fedorenko to Justice Department prosecutors.

In 2005, a Russian documentary, Secrets of the Century – Punishers: May 9th, claimed that in 1974, Fedorenko had visited Crimea as a tourist. There, he was recognised and drew the interest of the KGB. Afterwards, the Soviet government contacted the White House and requested that the case of Fedorenko be reviewed.

Denaturalization trial and deportation

Fedorenko was arrested and, in June 1978, brought for a denaturalization trial in district court at Fort Lauderdale, Florida. He testified over three days, denying that he had actually entered the section of the camp where the gas chambers were located but admitted that he had once been posted on a guard tower overlooking this section of the camp. "I saw how they were loading up dead people, loading them on the stretchers. ... And they were loading them in a hole." Later in his testimony, he reconfirmed that this part of the camp "is where there was the workers that took the bodies and buried them or stacked them in the holes. This is where the gas chambers were." Concerning the unloading of Jews from the trains, he testified: "Some were picked for work and the others, they went to the gas chambers". Fedorenko argued that his service at Treblinka had been involuntary and, since he had worked only as a perimeter guard, he had virtually no contact with the prisoners. He had mistreated no one and, therefore, when he lied on his immigration forms about his birthplace and wartime service, it was not about any material fact that would have excluded him from entering the US."

Six Treblinka survivors, however, testified that Fedorenko had in fact committed atrocities, namely beating and shooting Jewish prisoners. Eugeun Turowski said he saw Fedorenko shoot and whip Jewish prisoners. Schalom Kohn said Fedorenko beat him almost daily with an iron-tipped whip, and that he saw him whip and shoot other prisoners. Josef Czarny said he saw Fedorenko beat arriving prisoners and shoot one prisoner. Gustaw Boraks said he saw Fedorenko chase prisoners to the gas chambers, beating them as they went. He also said that on one occasion, he heard a shot and ran outside to see Fedorenko, with a gun drawn, standing close to a wounded woman who later told him that Fedorenko was responsible for the shooting. Sonia Lewkowicz said she saw Fedorenko shoot a Jewish prisoner. Lastly, Pinchas Epstein said Fedorenko shot and killed a friend of his, after making him crawl naked on all fours.

Judge Norman C. Roettger ruled in favor of Fedorenko, saying the witnesses were unreliable. Three of them could not conclusively identify Fedorenko, and the other three, Roettger alleged, appeared to have been coached. He ruled that the 71-year-old Fedorenko had himself been a "victim of Nazi aggression" and that the prosecutors had failed to prove Fedorenko had committed any atrocities while serving as a guard at the extermination camp. Further, after entering the US, Fedorenko had been a hard-working and responsible resident and citizen. He could keep his US citizenship.

However, since this was a civil rather than a criminal case, the government could appeal the decision and chose to do so. Allan Ryan then of the Solicitor General's Office presented the appeal before the Fifth Circuit Court on behalf of the INS. He argued that Fedorenko's deception when entering the US was a material fact that justified revocation of citizenship, that the district court had erred in judging the credibility of the survivor witnesses, and that it erred in its determination that Fedorenko's good conduct in the US after the war was relevant to the decision about revoking his citizenship. The appellate court agreed and, in August 1979, reversed the district court's decision. Fedorenko appealed to the Supreme Court which, in January of 1981, sustained the appellate court's decision. In December 1984, Fedorenko became the first Nazi war criminal to be deported to the Soviet Union.

Soviet trial and execution
In Punishers, it was claimed that he was not detained by the KGB upon arrival and spent weeks drinking in his native Dzhankoy, walking free until his arrest in January 1985 after a report titled "Nazi Fedorenko feels free in USSR" was reportedly published in The Washington Post. During his trial, Fedorenko's family disowned him, with his sons writing public letters denouncing him. 

Fedorenko spent about a year in jail before his trial in the Crimean Regional Court began on June 10, 1986. The trial was open to the public, and the courtroom, designed to accommodate 500 people, was packed. Upon hearing the indictment, people in the audience were outraged and said they wanted to "tear apart" Fedorenko. Surviving witnesses implicated him in numerous atrocities. Fedorenko claimed that "Jews were among my best friends, both in the Soviet Union and later." He denied any violent acts, with the exception of two executions which he claimed were justified.

The prosecutor was adamant that Fedorenko should be executed, while his lawyer asked the court for leniency on the grounds of his client's age. The court found that approximately 800,000 people were killed during Fedorenko's time in Treblinka. The trial lasted nine days, with Judge Mikhail Tyutyunnik sentencing Fedorenko to death on June 19, 1986. He was also ordered to forfeit all of his belongings. Upon hearing the verdict and sentence, the audience broke into loud applause. In Punishers, it was reported that Fedorenko, in tears, told the courtroom "I didn't want this" in his last statement, but displayed a lack of emotion upon the reading of the final verdict. A subsequent appeal to the Supreme Court of the USSR was rejected, and his execution by firing squad was announced on July 28, 1987.

See also

Fedorenko v. United States
John Demjanjuk
Karl Linnas
Algimantas Dailidė
Anton Geiser
Boļeslavs Maikovskis

Notes

References

1907 births
1987 deaths
People from Dzhankoy
People from Taurida Governorate
Holocaust trials
Holocaust perpetrators in Poland
Executed Ukrainian collaborators with Nazi Germany
Executed Soviet people from Ukraine
Loss of United States citizenship by prior Nazi affiliation
Nazis executed by the Soviet Union by firearm
People deported from the United States
People executed for war crimes
Soviet military personnel of World War II
Soviet prisoners of war
Soviet Union–United States relations
Treblinka extermination camp personnel
Ukrainian people convicted of war crimes
Ukrainian people executed by the Soviet Union
World War II prisoners of war held by Germany
Executed mass murderers